The July 2009 Mid-Atlantic tornadoes were a series of five tornadoes, two of which attained EF2 status, that touched down within one hour and thirty minutes in the Mid-Atlantic region of the United States.

Confirmed tornadoes

Pennsylvania
Two tornadoes touched down in Pennsylvania, one in Monroe County and one in Wyoming County. Five homes lost their roofs and several barns were destroyed along the tornado's path. Numerous power lines were also downed, resulting in several road closures. This tornado was one of 12 tornadoes to touch down in the county since 1950. In Cherry Valley, 25 power poles were downed, resulting in extensive internet and power outages. In Franklin County, a downburst caused structural damage.

New Jersey
In New Jersey, one EF2 tornado was confirmed in Sussex County. The tornado tracked for roughly  before dissipating. Along its track, thousands of trees were uprooted and snapped, numerous segments of guardrail were destroyed, acres of farmland were lost and several structures were damaged. The tornado, peaking with winds up to  touched down around 2:45 pm EDT and traveled for 15 minutes. The worst damage was along a  stretch of the track in Wantage where a state of emergency was declared; in this area, hundreds of trees were tossed in multiple directions, a corn field was decimated by the tornado's winds and damaged a dairy farm. Two of the barns on the dairy farm were destroyed and two others were severely damaged. A large portion of one of the barns roof was torn off, and was tossed roughly  before landing in the yard of another home. Another barn was pick up and twisted around despite being secured by 18 poles anchored 4 feet in the ground.

There were also 100 cows on the farm at the time of the tornado, of which one was reported missing. Residents who saw the tornado reported that two of the cows were picked up and tossed  by the tornado. On the dairy farm property alone, roughly 600 trees were uprooted. Torrential rainfall also fell within these storms, triggering widespread flash flooding. Numerous power lines were downed and a  radio tower collapsed due to the winds. The tornado was one of 145 to touch down in the state since 1950 and the first to hit Wantage in 29 years. Throughout the state, roughly 25,000 residences were left without power due to the storms.

New York
In Unionville, New York, near the New York-New Jersey state line, a brief EF0 tornado touched down around 3:05 pm EDT. Dozens of trees were damaged and several more were uprooted. The most severe damage took place along County Highway 36.

Maryland
Around 2:46 pm EDT, an EF1 tornado touched down near Oldtown, Maryland in Allegany County. Several roads were closed due to downed trees and power lines, including route 51. Several homes were also damaged by the tornado. A total of 810 residences were also left without power after the storm.

See also
Tornadoes of 2009

References

2009 natural disasters in the United States
Tornadoes of 2009
Environment of the Mid-Atlantic states
July 2009 events in the United States